Hogan Lovells  is an American-British law firm co-headquartered in London and Washington, DC. The firm was formed in 2010 by the merger of the American law firm Hogan & Hartson and the British law firm Lovells. As of 2022, the firm employed about 2,500 lawyers, making it the sixth largest firm in the world.

In 2022, Hogan Lovells was ranked as the twelfth largest law firm in the world by revenue, generating around US$2.6 billion. Revenue per lawyer exceeds US$1million.

Hogan Lovells claims specialization in "government regulatory, litigation, commercial litigation and arbitration, corporate, finance, and intellectual property".

Hogan Lovells was listed in Forbes' America's Top Trusted Corporate Law Firms 2019.

History

Hogan & Hartson

Hogan & Hartson was founded by Frank J. Hogan in 1904. In 1925, Hogan was joined by Nelson T. Hartson, a former Internal Revenue Service attorney, and John William Buttson Guider. Hogan & Hartson then went into partnership in 1938 with Buttson as a silent partner.

In 1970, Hogan & Hartson became the first major firm to establish a separate practice group devoted exclusively to providing pro bono legal services. The Community Services Department (CSD) dealt with civil rights, environmental, homeless and other public interest groups. In 1990, Hogan & Hartson opened an office in London, their first outside the U.S.

In 1972, the firm gained its first black law partner, trial lawyer Vincent H. Cohen (April 7, 1936 – Dec. 25, 2011), who was of Jamaican heritage; had joined the firm in 1969; and had previously held positions at the U.S. Department of Justice, and at the U.S. Equal Employment Opportunity Commission. Cohen's clients included Bell Atlantic, Pepco, and The Washington Post. His son, Vincent Cohen, Jr., served as an interim U.S. Attorney for the District of Columbia.

In 2000, the firm expanded to Tokyo and Berlin. The firm expanded its presence in New York and Los Angeles, in 2002, when it acquired mid-sized law firm Squadron, Ellenoff, Plesent & Sheinfeld, a storied New York City-based practice with strengths in media, litigation and First Amendment law.

At the time of the merger, Hogan & Hartson was the oldest major law firm headquartered in Washington, D.C., United States. It was a global firm with more than 1,100 lawyers in 27 offices worldwide, including offices in North America, Latin America, Europe, the Middle East and Asia.

Lovells

Lovells traced its history in the UK back to 1899, when John Lovell set up on his own account at Octavia Hill, between St Paul's and Smithfield.  He was later joined by Reginald White, a clerk in his previous firm, to whom he gave articles.  In 1924, they were joined by Charles King, forming Lovell, White & King.  Soon after formation, the firm moved to Thavies Inn at Holborn Circus and later to Serjeant's Inn, Fleet Street, before moving to 21 Holborn Viaduct in October 1977.

Lovells was formed as a result of a number of earlier mergers. In 1966, Lovell, White & King merged with Haslewoods, a firm with a much longer history of private client work. Haslewoods diverse clients included the Treasury Solicitor.  In 1988, Lovell, White & King, which by then had a large international commercial practice, merged with Durrant Piesse, known, in particular, for its specialism in commercial banking and financial services, forming Lovell White Durrant.  It then changed to Lovells in 2000 when the firm merged with German law firm Boesebeck Droste.  Other mergers then followed in other European countries during the early 2000s (decade).

In the early 2000s Lovells invested strongly in China, expanding its office in Beijing and opening an office in Shanghai becoming the second largest foreign firm in China.  Following five years of growth, culminating in the opening of the firm's Madrid office in 2004, Lovells had a presence in every major European jurisdiction. In 2007, Lovells opened an office in Dubai, offering legal services to corporations, financial institutions and individuals in the Middle East and at the beginning of 2009 opened an office in Hanoi. In September 2009, Lovells opened an associated office in Riyadh.

At the time of the merger, Lovells was a London-based international law firm with over 300 partners and around 3,150 employees operating from 26 offices in Europe, Asia and the United States.

Hogan Lovells

Hogan & Hartson and Lovells announced their agreement to merge on 15 December 2009. Hogan Lovells was officially formed on May 1, 2010.

In December 2011 it was reported that the firm would be moving to a single chairman model following the retirement of John Young.

In December 2013, Hogan Lovells merged with South African firm Routledge Modise. The addition of about 120 lawyers in the Johannesburg office make up the first physical location for Hogan Lovells in Africa although the firm maintains a presence in Francophone Africa through its Paris office.

Partners at Hogan Lovells have voted to confirm current Asia Pacific and Middle East regional chief executive Miguel Zaldivar as their new global CEO from 1 July 2020. Current head of the Litigation Arbitration and Employment practice, Michael Davison will be Deputy CEO from the same date. Both will serve initial four year terms.

Practice 

Hogan Lovells practices in a variety of commercial law. The firm has advised on the following matters:
Advised Kodak Pensioner Plan on its $650 million acquisition of the personal film business from Kodak.
Counselled tech-giant Dell on its $24.4 billion deal to go private.
Advised fashion label Nicole Farhi on its £5.5 million sale to businesswoman and heiress, Maxine Hargreaves-Adams.
 Advised long-standing client SABMiller on its £7.8 billion acquisition of Australian brewer Foster's Group on aspects of structuring the bid and acquisition finance.
 Advised SABMiller on its €1 billion Eurobond issue.
Advised Apple Inc. on its $17 billion (£10.9 billion) bond issue, described as the largest corporate bond offering in history.
Assisted with the negotiation of terms with Fairtrade regarding sourcing and use of sustainable cocoa in Maltesers for Mars Candy.
Advised the Republic of Ecuador in the negotiation of a multimillion-dollar facility agreement to be used by the state-owned television and radio network, RTV Ecuador.
In May 2014, Snapchat turned to Hogan Lovells to hire its first General Counsel, appointing a Washington DC-based partner.
In July 2015, power management semiconductor company Semitrex hired Hogan Lovells to lobby for energy efficiency issues.
On December 19, 2017 Massachusetts Senate Committee in Ethics hired Hogan Lovells to lead an inquiry into Senate President Stanley C. Rosenberg’s conduct and whether he violated the rules of the Senate stemming from allegations from four men that Rosenberg’s husband, Bryon Hefner, sexually assaulted or harassed them and bragged he had influence on Senate business.

Lobbying in the United States 
Hogan Lovells is among the largest lobbying firms in the United States. Before the merger, by revenue, Hogan & Hartson was among the top five lobbying firms in the United States. Since the merger, the firm has remained among the largest lobbying firms, servicing $12.3 million in lobbying 2013.

South African Revenue Service (SARS) scandal 
In October 2016, Hogan Lovells was inserted into the Jonas Makwaka investigation as part of the Zuma corruption scandal. The firm's role was "to conduct an independent investigation into allegations against Mr Jonas Makwakwa and Ms Kelly Ann Elskie". Although the report concluded that "disciplinary action should be taken", the document was widely seen as effectively a whitewash. Other international firms implicated in Zuma related scandals have included KPMG and McKinsey.

Notable attorneys and alumni

Current attorneys
 Neal Katyal – Former Acting Solicitor General of the United States
 Edith Ramirez – Former Chair of the Federal Trade Commission
 Christopher Wolf – Internet and privacy law pioneer

Former attorneys

Judiciary
 James A. Belson – Judge of the District of Columbia Court of Appeals
 Tanya S. Chutkan – Judge of the United States District Court for the District of Columbia
 Daniel D. Domenico – Judge of the United States District Court for the District of Colorado
 John M. Ferren – Judge of the District of Columbia Court of Appeals
 Ann Lininger – Judge of the Clackamas County Circuit Court
 George W. Miller – Judge of the United States Court of Federal Claims
 Carlos G. Muñiz – Justice of the Supreme Court of Florida
 David Nahmias – Associate Justice of the Supreme Court of Georgia
 John Pajak – Special trial judge of the United States Tax Court
 John Roberts – Chief Justice of the United States
 Jane Marum Roush – Justice of the Supreme Court of Virginia
 Donald S. Russell – Judge of the United States Court of Appeals for the Fourth Circuit
 John Sirica – Judge of the United States District Court for the District of Columbia, presiding judge in the Watergate cases
 David S. Tatel – Judge of the United States Court of Appeals for the District of Columbia Circuit
 Eric T. Washington – Judge of the District of Columbia Court of Appeals
 Wilhelmina Wright – Judge of the United States District Court for the District of Minnesota

Elected office
 Norm Coleman – United States Senator from Minnesota
 J. William Fulbright – United States Senator from Arkansas
 Josh Hawley – United States Senator from Missouri
 Scott McInnis – Member of the U.S. House of Representatives from Colorado's 3rd district
 John Porter – Member of the U.S. House of Representatives from Illinois's 10th district
 Paul Rogers – Member of the U.S. House of Representatives from Florida's 11th district
 John Warner – Former United States Senator from Virginia

Academia
 Audrey J. Anderson – Vice Chancellor, General Counsel and University Secretary for Vanderbilt University
 Matthew Daniels – Chair of Law and Human Rights and Founder of the Center for Human Rights and International Affairs at the Institute of World Politics
 Christopher Yoo – John H. Chestnut Professor of Law, Communication, and Computer and Information Science at the University of Pennsylvania Law School
 Chris Brand - Research Fellow, Psychology and Psychometrics at Nuffield College

Other government service
 A. Lee Bentley III – United States Attorney for the Middle District of Florida
 Sandy Berger – United States National Security Advisor
 William Bittman – Federal prosecutor responsible for prosecuting Jimmy Hoffa and Bobby Baker
 Mark Brzezinski – U.S. Ambassador to Sweden
 Charles B. Curtis – United States Deputy Secretary of Energy
 Cole Finegan – Denver’s City Attorney and Chief of Staff 
 Gregory G. Garre – 44th U.S. Solicitor General
 Anthony Stephen Harrington – U.S. Ambassador to Brazil
 Brian Hook – United States Special Representative for Iran
 Kevin S. Huffman – Commissioner of the Tennessee Department of Education
 Elliot F. Kaye – Commissioner of the U.S. Consumer Product Safety Commission
 Loretta Lynch – 83rd U.S. Attorney General
 Keisha A. McGuire – Grenadian Permanent Representative to the United Nations
 Jelena McWilliams – Chairman of the Federal Deposit Insurance Corporation
 Cheryl Mills – Counselor of the United States Department of State
 Elliot Mincberg – General Deputy Assistant Secretary for Congressional and Intergovernmental Relations at the Department of Housing and Urban Development
 Ignacia S. Moreno – Assistant Attorney General for the United States Department of Justice Environment and Natural Resources Division
 John E. Osborn – Member of the United States Advisory Commission on Public Diplomacy
 Daniel Poneman – Acting United States Secretary of Energy
 Elizabeth Prelogar – 48th U.S. Solicitor General
 Chuck Rosenberg – Administrator of the Drug Enforcement Administration; United States Attorney for the Eastern District of Virginia
 Tom Strickland – United States Attorney for the District of Colorado; Assistant Secretary of the Interior for Fish, Wildlife and Parks
 Christine A. Varney – White House Cabinet Secretary; Commissioner of the Federal Trade Commission
 Clayton Yeutter – Counselor to the President; Chair of the Republican National Committee; U.S. Secretary of Agriculture; U.S. Trade Representative

Other
 Robert S. Bennett – Attorney for President Bill Clinton during the Lewinsky scandal
 Ty Cobb – Member of the Trump administration legal team
 Robert Corn-Revere – First Amendment lawyer
 Donald Dell – Sports attorney, writer, commentator, and former tennis player
 Frank Fahrenkopf – Chair of the Republican National Committee; Co-founder of the Commission on Presidential Debates
 Frank J. Hogan – Founder of Hogan Lovells; President of the American Bar Association
 Khizr Muazzam Khan – Parent of Humayun Khan
 Duncan McNair – Lawyer and author
 David Wendell Phillips – Angel investor and executive
 Radoslav Procházka – Slovak politician
 Jessica Prunell – Former child actress
 Regina M. Rodriguez – Former nominee to the United States District Court for the District of Colorado
 Edward "Smitty" Smith – Candidate for Attorney General of the District of Columbia
 Allen Snyder – Former nominee to the U.S. Court of Appeals for the District of Columbia Circuit
 Parker Thomson – Lawyer and philanthropist
 Merle Thorpe Jr. – Lawyer and philanthropist
 Ted Trimpa – Democratic strategist, lobbyist and political consultant
 Christine Warnke – Senior vice president at Capitol Hill Consulting Group and talk show host
 Daniel R. White – Author
 Edward Bennett Williams – Founder of Williams & Connolly; Treasurer of the Democratic National Committee

See also
Hogan Lovells Professor of Law and Finance, a position at the University of Oxford

References

External links

Law firms of the United Kingdom
Law firms based in Washington, D.C.
Intellectual property law firms
Patent law firms
Companies based in the City of London
Law firms established in 2010
Foreign law firms with offices in Hong Kong
Foreign law firms with offices in Japan
Foreign law firms with offices in the Netherlands
2010 establishments in England
2010 establishments in Washington, D.C.